King Gordy Sings the Blues is the sixth studio album by American rapper King Gordy and his first blues album as a result of decision to take a break from his regular horrorcore music style. It was recorded in 2004 in F.B.T. Studios in Ferndale, Michigan, and released on February 15, 2011 via Morbid Music L.L.C. Production was handled by Silent Riot, Paradime and King Gordy himself.

Track listing

Personnel 
Waverly Walter Alford III – writer, performer, co-producer (tracks: 6, 11)
Frederick Beauregard – producer (track 7)
Che Patterson – design & photography
Silent Riot – producer (tracks: 1-6, 8-11)

References 

2011 albums
King Gordy albums
Blues albums by American artists